Andronovka is a rural locality (a village) in Vereshchaginsky District, Perm Krai, Russia. The population was 53 as of 2010.

Geography 
Andronovka is located 20 km southwest of Vereshchagino, the district's administrative centre, by road. Denisovka and Putino are the nearest rural localities.

References 

Rural localities in Vereshchaginsky District